"Unshakeable" is an electronic rock single by Celldweller from Wish Upon a Blackstar, it is the second single from the album, and the second Celldweller song to receive airplay (the other being "I Believe You"), the radio edit was released free through Alternative Press and SoundCloud on May 15, 2012.

"Unshakeable" was later remixed by BT and Seamless, and was released as its own single on October 22, 2013.

Music video
An animated video, directed by Josh Viola, was announced on October 20, 2012, in an interview concerning the production of The Bane of Yoto. The video was released on December 6, 2013.

Track listing

BT & Seamless Remix

References

2012 singles
Celldweller songs
2012 songs